The Wilmington District Brigade was an administrative division of the North Carolina militia during the American Revolutionary War (1776–1783). This unit was established by the North Carolina Provincial Congress on May 4, 1776, and disbanded at the end of the war.

Leadership
Colonel John Ashe, Sr. was the first commander of the New Hannover County  Regiment in 1775. He commanded the Wilmington District brigade from 1776 to 1778 when he was promoted on May 4, 1776 to Major General over all North Carolina militia and state troops until 1779.  
 Brigadier General John Ashe, Sr. (1776-1778)
 Brigadier General John Alexander Lillington (1779-1783)
 Brigadier General (Pro Tempore) James Kenan (1781)

Regiments
The following are the North Carolina militia regiments and subordination of the Wilmington District Brigade, along with the dates established and disestablished.

1st and 2nd Battalions of Militia
The 1st and 2nd Battalions of Militia were hastily established on May 7, 1776 because of the threat of  British fleet off the coast of North Carolina at Cape Fear in March 1776. The British did not come ashore in any large number and intended to go to Charleston, South Carolina, instead. The Battalions were marched to Wilmington but saw no action. They saw no action and were disbanded on August 13, 1776. The troops were sent home.  

The 1st Battalion of Militia was commanded by Colonel Thomas Brown. The 2nd Battalion of Militia was commanded by Col. Peter Dauge. Col. Philemon Hawkins, Jr. had initially been appointed as commander of the 2nd Battalion but he declined the commission.

Bladen County Regiment
The Bladen County Regiment established in Bladen County on July 16, 1775. It was authorized on September 9, 1775 by the Province of North Carolina Congress and commanded by Col. Thomas Robeson, Jr. (17751779, 1781), Col. Thomas Brown (17781782), and Col. Thomas Owen (17761783, 2nd colonel). The regiment was engaged in 16 known battles and skirmishes between 1776 and 1781. It was disbanded at the end of the war in 1783.

Brunswick County Regiment
The Brunswick County Regiment was subordinated to the Wilmington District Brigade. It was established in March 1775. The first commander of the regiment was Colonel Robert Howe.

Cumberland County Regiment
The Cumberland County Regiment was subordinate to the Wilmington District Brigade. The regiment was established on September 9, 1775. The first commander was Colonel Thomas Rutherford.

Duplin County Regiment
The Duplin County Regiment was subordinate to the Wilmington District Brigade. The regiment was established on September 9, 1775. The first commander was Colonel James Kenan.

New Hanover County Regiment
The New Hannover County Regiment was subordinated to the Wilmington District Brigade. The regiment was established in March 1775. The initial commander was Colonel James Moore.

Onslow County Regiment
The Onslow County Regiment was subordinate to the Wilmington Districgt Brigade. It was established on September 9, 1775. The first commander of the regiment was Colonel William Cray.

Engagements
Regiments of the Wilmington District Brigade were involved in 49 known engagements (battles, sieges, and skirmishes), including one in Georgia, 9 in South Carolina, 39 in North Carolina. The 1st and 2nd Battalion of Militia did not see any action. One or more companies of these regiments were involved in each engagement.

References

 Paul David Nelson. William Tryon and the Course of Empire. Chapel Hill, NC: Univ of North Carolina Press, 1990. pp. 42-43.

See also
 List of North Carolina militia units in the American Revolution
 Wilmington, North Carolina
North Carolina militia
1776 establishments in North Carolina
1783 disestablishments in the United States